Merlin "The Magician" Malinowski (born September 27, 1958) is a Canadian former professional ice hockey centre. Malinowski was born in North Battleford, Saskatchewan, but grew up in Meadow Lake, Saskatchewan.

Playing career
Malinowski was drafted in the 2nd Round, 27th overall by the Colorado Rockies in the 1978 NHL Entry Draft. He played 5 seasons in the National Hockey League for the Rockies, the New Jersey Devils and the Hartford Whalers. He then had a long spell in Switzerland, playing for the EHC Arosa and later the SCL Tigers from 1983 until his retirement in 1991. He also played for the Canadian Olympic Team that finished 4th in the 1988 Winter Olympics.

Career statistics

Regular season and playoffs

International

References

External links

1958 births
Living people
Canadian ice hockey right wingers
Canadian people of Polish descent
Colorado Rockies (NHL) draft picks
Colorado Rockies (NHL) players
EHC Arosa players
Fort Worth Texans players
Hartford Whalers players
Sportspeople from Meadow Lake, Saskatchewan
Sportspeople from North Battleford
Ice hockey players at the 1988 Winter Olympics
Medicine Hat Tigers players
New Jersey Devils players
Olympic ice hockey players of Canada
Philadelphia Firebirds (AHL) players
SCL Tigers players
Ice hockey people from Saskatchewan
Canadian expatriate ice hockey players in Switzerland